The Chitty Museum is a museum about the minority Chitty community, which is located within the Chitty Village area in Malacca City, Malacca, Malaysia. It is housed in a traditional Chitty house which has been renovated by PERZIM.

The Chitty had previously desired to run a museum but were stymied by the 1997 Asian financial crisis. Visits in June 2000 by Tan Sri Datuk Seri Haji Mohd Ali Rustam, Chief Minister of Malacca at the time, secured the necessary funding to establish the museum. The construction of the museum was funded by Malacca State Government and completed in September 2002. It was constructed by Malacca Museum Corporation (PERZIM). The museum was opened on 5 August 2003 to introduce the culture of Chitty community.

The museum exhibits all of the information regarding Chitty community. It houses a collection of artifacts and archives of the daily life of Chitty people, ranging from history, temple, attire, trustee, food, culture, religious affairs etc.

See also
 List of museums in Malaysia
 List of tourist attractions in Malacca

References

2003 establishments in Malaysia
Museums established in 2003
Museums in Malacca